"Luchini AKA This Is It" is the first single released from Camp Lo's debut album, Uptown Saturday Night. The song was produced by up-and-coming producer Ski and used a sample of Dynasty's 1980 song "Adventures in the Land of Music" and the drums from “All Night Long” by “Mary Jane Girls”.

The song became Camp Lo's biggest hit, peaking at #50 on the Billboard Hot 100 while also becoming a bigger hit on the Rap Singles chart where it reached #5.

Single track listing

A-Side
"Luchini AKA This Is It" (Radio Edit) 
"Luchini AKA This Is It" (Instrumental)

B-Side
"Swing" (Radio Edit)
"Swing" (Instrumental) 
"Luchini AKA This Is It" (Acappella)

Chart history

Peak positions

Year-End charts

References

1997 singles
1996 songs
Profile Records singles
Song recordings produced by Ski Beatz
Songs written by Leon Sylvers III